William Duff Forrest (June 2, 1874 – September 12, 1939) was a physician and political figure in Nova Scotia, Canada. He represented Halifax Centre in the Nova Scotia House of Assembly from 1937 to 1939 as a Liberal member.

He was born in Halifax, the son of the Reverend John Forrest and Annie Prescott Duff. Forrest was educated at Dalhousie University and continued his studies in medicine in London and Edinburgh. In 1906, he married J. Frances Thomas. Forrest was chairman of the Halifax Board of Health from 1925 to 1929 and from 1930 to 1937. He died in office in Halifax at the age of 65.

References 
 A Directory of the Members of the Legislative Assembly of Nova Scotia, 1758-1958, Public Archives of Nova Scotia (1958)

1874 births
1939 deaths
Nova Scotia Liberal Party MLAs